Men was an American gay pornographic magazine originally published as Advocate Men from 1984 until 1997, when it was retitled Men. It was published by Los Angeles-based Specialty Publications. The magazine contains explicit nude male photography, often featuring popular stars from the gay adult film industry, erotic fiction, erotic comics, video reviews and other features. Notable models have included Zeb Atlas and Mark Dalton. Notable artists include Gerard Donelan who contributed erotic comics to the magazine for eight years. In late 2009, it was announced that all of Specialty Publications' gay porn magazines would be merged into Unzipped.net. The website in question is no longer available and no issues of any of the magazines have been released since.

History 

Advocate Men started as a sister publication to The Advocate, a gay and lesbian news monthly, and became a monthly publication from November 1984. Starting with the October 1997 issue it changed its name to simply Men.

See also 

 List of gay pornographic magazines

References

External links 
 Men at Gay Erotic Archives

Pornographic magazines published in the United States
LGBT-related magazines published in the United States
Defunct magazines published in the United States
Gay male pornographic magazines
Gay male pornography in the United States
Magazines established in 1984
Magazines disestablished in 2009
Magazines published in Los Angeles
1987 establishments in the United States